The Diocese of Southwell and Nottingham is a Church of England diocese in the Province of York, headed by the Bishop of Southwell and Nottingham. It covers all the English county of Nottinghamshire and a few parishes in South Yorkshire. It is bordered by the dioceses of Derby, Leicester, Lincoln and Sheffield. The cathedral, Southwell Minster, is in the town of Southwell, 15 miles (24 km) north of Nottingham.

History
Until 2005 the diocese was named simply Southwell, but in February the diocesan synod requested a change of name, which was approved by the General Synod of the Church of England in July and by the Privy Council on 15 November 2005.

The present territory of the diocese was originally the Archdeaconry of Nottingham in the Diocese of York, before it was moved in 1837 to the Diocese of Lincoln (so switching from the Province of York to the Province of Canterbury). On 5 February 1884 it was taken from Lincoln and united with the archdeaconry of Derby (covering, roughly, Derbyshire), which was taken from the Diocese of Lichfield. The two then formed a new Diocese of Southwell, which covered Nottinghamshire and Derbyshire. The Diocese of Derby became separate on 7 July 1927; Southwell and Nottingham is once again in the Province of York (since 25 October 1935, according to the Diocese of Southwell (Transfer) Measure, 1935).

Bishops
The diocesan bishop is Paul Williams, assisted by Andy Emerton, the Bishop suffragan of Sherwood, whose See of Sherwood was created in 1965. Alternative episcopal oversight (for the few parishes in the diocese which do not receive the ministry of priests who are women) is provided by a provincial episcopal visitor (PEV), the Bishop suffragan of Beverley, Glyn Webster. He is licensed as an honorary assistant bishop of the diocese.

Today the bishop's residence and office, the diocesan offices and the cathedral all remain in Southwell.

Archdeaconries and deaneries

List of churches in the diocese
Closed churches are listed in italics.

See also
Archdeacon of Nottingham
Anglican Bishop of Nottingham

References
Church of England Statistics 2002

External links
Diocese of Southwell

 
Christianity in Nottinghamshire
Dioceses established in the 19th century
Religious organizations established in 1884